Jessey Voorn (born 17 March 1990 in Amsterdam) is a Dutch professional basketball player who last played for Heroes Den Bosch. Voorn is 6 ft 4 tall and plays the shooting guard position.

Professional career
Voorn started his professional career with ABC Amsterdam in 2007, where he was mainly on the bench at first. With Amsterdam he won the Dutch championship in 2009. When the club was forced to play without foreign players, Voorn got major minutes with ABC. In the 2010-11 season Voorn averaged 13.7 points per game in the Dutch Basketball League.

After his break-out season, the club from Amsterdam went bankrupt and Voorn went to Groningen to play for the GasTerra Flames. After the 2013–14 season, Voorn left Groningen.

He signed with Canarias Basketball Academy in January 2015.

For the 2014–15 season, Voorn signed with Landstede Basketbal.

On 1 July 2016, he signed a two-year deal with Zorg en Zekerheid Leiden.

On 14 June 2018, Voorn signed a two-year contract with New Heroes Den Bosch. On 15 November 2019, Voorn and Den Bosch agreed to part ways.

3x3 basketball
In 2020, Voorn joined the Netherlands national 3x3 team. He played at the 2020 Summer Olympics in Tokyo, where the team finished in the fifth place.

References

External links
Jessey Voorn at RealGM

1990 births
Living people
Amsterdam Basketball players
Donar (basketball club) players
Heroes Den Bosch players
Dutch Basketball League players
Dutch men's basketball players
Landstede Hammers players
Shooting guards
Basketball players from Amsterdam
B.S. Leiden players
3x3 basketball players at the 2020 Summer Olympics
Olympic 3x3 basketball players of the Netherlands